Thomas John Hovell-Thurlow-Cumming-Bruce, 5th Baron Thurlow, PC, FRS  (5 December 1838 – 12 March 1916), was a British Liberal politician who served as Paymaster-General in 1886.

Family

Thurlow was the younger son of Edward Thomas Hovell-Thurlow, 3rd Baron Thurlow, and a great-grandson of The Right Reverend Thomas Thurlow, Bishop of Durham from 1787 to 1791. Lord Chancellor Edward Thurlow, 1st Baron Thurlow, was his great-great-uncle. In 1864 he married Lady Elma Bruce (d. 1923), daughter of James Bruce, 8th Earl of Elgin. Thurlow assumed in 1873 by Royal licence his wife's maiden name of Bruce, and one year later the surname of Cumming as well. On the death of his elder brother in 1874 he succeeded as 5th Baron Thurlow, which gave him a seat in the House of Lords.

Political career
Six years later, in 1880, Lord Thurlow was appointed a Government Whip in the Liberal administration of William Ewart Gladstone. He held this post until 1885, when the Liberals fell from power. When Gladstone returned to power in February 1886, he made Thurlow Paymaster-General, which he remained until the Liberals again lost power in August of that year. The same year he was also admitted to the Privy Council.

Lord Thurlow also served as High Commissioner to the General Assembly of the Church of Scotland in 1886. He died on 12 March 1916, aged 77, and was succeeded in the Barony by his son Charles Edward.

Deputy Lieutenants of Stirlingshire
Liberal Party (UK) Lords-in-Waiting
1838 births
1916 deaths
Lords High Commissioner to the General Assembly of the Church of Scotland
Members of the Privy Council of the United Kingdom
Fellows of the Royal Society
Thomas
Thomas